The flag of Niue was adopted on 15 October 1975. It consists of the Union Jack in the upper left corner with a star in the middle of the Union Jack and four stars forming a diamond around it. It is very unusual for a flag based on a British ensign design, in having not only a yellow background, but also a defaced (edited) Union Jack in the canton. It was designed by Patricia Rex, the wife of the then-Premier Robert Rex.

Definition
From the Niue Flag Act 1975: "The Niue National Flag shall be a golden yellow flag, bearing on the upper canton of the hoist thereof the Union Flag, commonly known as the Union Jack, displaying 2 five-pointed yellow stars on the vertical line and on the horizontal line thereof separated by a blue disc containing a larger five-pointed yellow star."

Symbolism
The symbolism represented by the flag is described in the Act.  The Union Jack symbolises the protection granted by the United Kingdom in 1900 after petitioning by the Kings and Chiefs of Niue. The yellow field symbolises "the bright sunshine of Niue and the warm feelings of the Niuean people towards New Zealand and her people." The association with New Zealand, which took over responsibility and administration of Niue in 1901, is also represented by the four small stars that depict the Southern Cross. Finally, the blue disc containing a larger star represents the deep blue sea surrounding the self-governing island of Niue.

See also
Seal of Niue
List of New Zealand flags

References

External links

Flags of the World - Niue
Niue Flag Act 1975

National symbols of Niue
Flag
National flags
Southern Cross flags
Flags with crosses
Niue
1975 establishments in Niue
Niue
Niue